Nikolay Anatolyevich Komlichenko (born 24 March 1973) is a former Russian professional football player.

Club career
He played 6 seasons in the Russian Football National League for FC Druzhba Maykop, FC Kuban Krasnodar and FC Neftekhimik Nizhnekamsk.

Honours
 Russian Third League Zone 1 top scorer: 1994 (22 goals).

Personal life
His son, also called Nikolay, is a professional footballer as well.

References

1973 births
People from Dinskoy District
Living people
Russian people of Ukrainian descent
Russian footballers
Association football midfielders
FC Kuban Krasnodar players
FC Baltika Kaliningrad players
FC Spartak Semey players
FC Neftekhimik Nizhnekamsk players
FC Spartak-UGP Anapa players
Kazakhstan Premier League players
Russian expatriate footballers
Expatriate footballers in Kazakhstan
Sportspeople from Krasnodar Krai